Aminomonas is a genus of bacteria from the family of Synergistaceae with one known species (Aminomonas paucivorans). Aminomonas paucivorans has been isolated from an anaerobic lagoon of a dairy wastewater treatment plant.

References

Synergistota
Bacteria genera
Monotypic bacteria genera